The Spanish Golden Gloves was a boxing tournament sponsored by El Diario La Prensa in the New York Metropolitan Area and sanctioned by the Amateur Athletic Union (AAU).

Notable winners include:
Chris Eubank
Joe Cortez
José Torres
Kevin Kelley
Michael Bentt

See also
 Golden Gloves

 
Amateur boxing